"Joga a chave" (English: "Throw me the key") is a samba song composed in 1952 by Brazilian composer and singer Adoniran Barbosa (real name João Rubinato) with the radio-journalist Osvaldo Moles.

History 

The song tells about a man who had a habit to drink and always used to return home late at night. His wife always locked him out, and he asked his love to throw him the key, because it was all bad outside and so he won't continue to disturb her sleep.

Others versions 

 1990 — Demônios da Garoa
 2012 — Dona Zaíra

See also
 Trem das Onze
 Samba Italiano
 Samba do Arnesto
 Tiro ao Álvaro

References

Brazilian songs
Portuguese-language songs
Samba songs
Songs written by Adoniran Barbosa
1952 songs